New Era is an unincorporated community in DeKalb County, Indiana, in the United States.

History
A post office was established at New Era in 1868, and remained in operation until it was discontinued in 1906.

References

Unincorporated communities in DeKalb County, Indiana
Unincorporated communities in Indiana